DeMarcus Faggins (born June 13, 1979) is a former American football cornerback. He was drafted by the Houston Texans in the sixth round of the 2002 NFL Draft. He played college football at Kansas State.

Faggins was also a member of the Tennessee Titans and Detroit Lions.

Early years
Faggins attended Irving High School in Irving, Texas and was a student and a letterman in football. In football, as a senior, he was a first-team All-City selection and a second-team All-State selection. Faggins was inducted in the Irving Independent School District Athletic Hall of Fame in 2016.

References

External links
Just Sports Stats
Houston Texans bio
Tennessee Titans bio

1979 births
Living people
People from Irving, Texas
Players of American football from Texas
American football cornerbacks
Navarro Bulldogs football players
Kansas State Wildcats football players
Houston Texans players
Tennessee Titans players
Detroit Lions players
Omaha Nighthawks players
Sportspeople from the Dallas–Fort Worth metroplex